Red Wedding is a documentary film about forced marriage under the Khmer Rouge regime. Red Wedding may also refer to:

The Red Wedding, a scene from the novel A Storm of Swords by George R. R. Martin
 "The Rains of Castamere", the Game of Thrones television adaptation of the scene
 The Communist nickname for Wedding (Berlin), after the First World War

See also
Red as a traditional color of wedding dresses in Asia
Blood Wedding (disambiguation)